The papal ferula (Latin ferula, 'rod') is the pastoral staff used in the Catholic Church by the pope. It is a rod with a knob on top surmounted by a cross. It differs from a crosier, the staff carried by other Latin Church bishops, which is curved or bent at the top in the style of a shepherd's crook.

History

Early usage and dispute
Traditionally, the popes did not use any ferula, crosier, or pastoral staff as part of the papal liturgy. The use of a staff is not mentioned in descriptions of Papal Masses in the Ordines Romani. In the early days of the Church a pope would sometimes carry a crosier, but this practice disappeared by the time of Pope Innocent III. Innocent III noted in his De Sacro altaris mysterio (“Concerning the Sacred Mystery of the Altar,” I, 62): “The Roman Pontiff does not use the shepherd's staff.” The reason was that a crosier is often given by the metropolitan archbishop (or another bishop) to a newly elected bishop during his investiture or episcopal ordination. In contrast, the pope does not receive investiture from another bishop and is invested with the pallium during his coronation or the modern inauguration.

Re-adoption
During the High Middle Ages, the popes once again began using a staff known as a ferula as insignia to signify temporal power and governance, which included "the power to mete out punishment and impose penances". The actual form of the staves from this period is not well known, but were likely staffs topped with a knob and a single-barred cross on top. The staff was not a liturgical item, and its use was limited to a few extraordinary ceremonial occasions, such as the opening of the Holy Door and the consecration of churches, during which the pope "took hold of the staff to knock on the door three times and to trace the Greek and Latin letters on the floor of the church".

Modern usage
The pastoral staff carried by the popes since Pope Paul VI is a contemporary single-barred crucifix, designed by the Italian artist Lello Scorzelli in 1963 and carried and used in the same manner as a bishop uses his crosier. Paul VI had actually used three other ferulas, similar in style, with the other versions having a cross bar which was straight, or bent upward. Scorzelli's well-known version has the cross bar curving downward, much like the paterissa carried by a bishops of Eastern Catholic Churches. Paul VI first used this staff on 8 December 1965, at the closing of the Second Vatican Council. The Scorzelli staff was the one retained by his successors starting with Pope John Paul I. This ferula design is often associated with Pope John Paul II and is one of his identifying attributes in religious paintings and statuary.

On 25 March 1983, Pope John Paul II used the ferula of Leo XIII with three horizontal bars in the opening of the Holy Door during the Jubilee, the Holy Year of the Redemption. In 1990, Scorzelli made a replica of the Paul VI ferula for John Paul II, which was lighter than the previous one.

On 16 March 2008, at the Palm Sunday celebrations in Saint Peter's Square, Pope Benedict XVI used the ferula of Pius IX. This staff was used until 28 November 2009 at the First Vespers for Advent. A new ferula was given to Pope Benedict XVI as a gift of the Circolo San Pietro and, according to Monsignor Guido Marini, the Master of Apostolic Ceremonies and head of the Office for the Liturgical Celebrations of the Supreme Pontiff, it "can be considered to all intents and purposes the pastoral staff of Benedict XVI."

Pope Francis continued to use the ferula of Benedict XVI at the beginning of his pontificate. On 7 April 2013, at the Mass for the Possession of the Chair of the Bishop of Rome in the Archbasilica of Saint John Lateran in Rome, Francis returned to using the 1965 ferula of Paul VI with the corpus on it, and has since alternated its use with the ferula of Benedict XVI.

References

Further reading
Bühren, Ralf van: Kunst und Kirche im 20. Jahrhundert. Die Rezeption des Zweiten Vatikanischen Konzils (Konziliengeschichte, Reihe B: Untersuchungen), Paderborn: Ferdinand Schöningh 2008

External links
The Office of the Liturgical Celebrations of the Supreme Pontiff: The Staff 
L'Ufficio delle celebrazioni liturgiche del sommo pontefice: La ferula 
Philippi Collection: Crozier - Bishops' Staff - Posoch - Zezel - Pilgrim's Staff

Papal vestments
Ritual weapons
Honorary weapons
Ceremonial weapons